Bessemer City is a small suburban city in Gaston County, North Carolina, United States. The population is 5,340 (as of the 2010 census). It was settled in 1756 and founded in 1893.

Geography
Bessemer City is located at  (35.284262, -81.282853).

History

Bessemer City is named for Sir Henry Bessemer who created the Bessemer process for smelting iron. Bessemer City was founded on land purchased from the Ormand family, near the Sloan-Washington-Ormand Iron Furnace, but the Bessemer Process made Bessemer City's early iron smelting industry obsolete.

By 1786, a furnace had been built on the land, called the Washington Furnace after the family of Colonel John C. Washington. The Old Ormand Furnace was used to process most of the iron ore that was mined in the area and today is one of the oldest remaining furnaces in the country. Despite a local tale that cannonballs were made during the Revolutionary War, there is no proof the furnace was built that early. The furnace was sold and later bought back by the family of Zenas Stanhope Ormand (b. July 12, 1802 - d. July 28, 1878). The furnace made iron implements and other products for local and statewide use and was in operation until the mid-19th century (when the Bessemer process made small furnace operations uneconomical). The "Old Furnace" is still owned by the Ormand Family Foundation, and the site is used as a gathering place for the Ormand, Ormond Family Reunion, one of the oldest family reunions in America, held annually since 1897.

During the late 1840s, corn and cotton were the region's two main crops. Whiskey production was also profitable. Gaston County had more licensed whiskey distilleries than any county in North Carolina.

In 1871, the Atlanta & Charlotte Division of the Richmond & Danville Railroad Company built through Gaston County.  Laying the track through Whetstone Mountain, located west of modern-day Bessemer City, was considered a great engineering accomplishment. John Wooten built a general store next to the railroad on the site of present-day Bessemer City and called the store and depot "Wooten's Station".

In 1891, John Askew Smith, previously of Reidsville, North Carolina, moved with his wife Fannie and brother-in-law, John A. Pinchback, to Gaston County. Smith purchased  and wanted to establish a town to the east of Whetstone Mountain. By 1893, Smith and other residents petitioned the North Carolina legislature to incorporate the town. On March 6, 1893, Bessemer City was officially chartered. Smith hired W.R. Richardson, an engineer from Guilford County, to lay out the town. In 1896 Smith built the first luxurious home in the area he named "Long View" where he lived with his wife for nearly 20 years. This house still stands in pristine condition, and the Mitchell family has taken up its stewardship. Smith's "Highacre" house, built in the early 20th century, is now occupied by the Eury family.

The population of Bessemer City at the time of its charter was very small, with only a few families, but by 1900 it had grown to between 500 and 600 people. In 1895, Stonewall Jackson Durham and John M. Odell incorporated Southern Cotton Mills and as their first venture completed and opened the failed Smith/Pinchback Mill. A series of textile mills opened by Smith and Pinchback; Durham and Odell; Frank, Robert and Max Goldberg; as well as the Ragan Spinning Company, gave Bessemer City its industrial foundation.

In 1929 Textile mill striker and songwriter Ella Mae Wiggins, 29, the mother of nine, is killed when local vigilantes, thugs and a sheriff's deputy force the pickup truck in which she is riding off the road and begin shooting.

A native of Sevierville, Tennessee, Wiggins by 1926 settled in Gaston County, N.C., living in an African-American neighborhood outside Bessemer City known as Stumptown. Her neighbors would look after her children as she worked as a spinner at American Mill No. 2. According to an article published online by the North Carolina Museum of History, "she worked twelve-hour days, six days a week, earning about nine dollars a week."She became a bookkeeper for the union, which was Communist run, and traveled to Washington, D.C., to testify about labor practices in the South. She also told her story: "I’m the mother of nine. Four died with the whooping cough, all at once. I was working nights, I asked the super to put me on days, so’s I could tend ‘em when they had their bad spells. But he wouldn't. I don’t know why. ... So I had to quit, and then there wasn't no money for medicine, and they just died." She also sang her ballads, including her best-known song, "A Mill Mother’s Lament," which has been recorded by Pete Seeger, among others. Wiggins believed in organizing African-Americans along with whites, and in a close vote, her local NTWU branch voted to admit African-Americans to the union.

On September 14, 1929, she and other union members drove to a union meeting in Gastonia. They were met by an armed mob, and turned back. They had driven about five miles toward home when they were stopped by a car; armed men jumped out and began shooting. Wiggins was shot in the chest and killed. Her five children were sent to live in orphanages. Five Loray Mill employees were charged in Wiggins's murder but were acquitted after less than 30 minutes of deliberation in a trial in Charlotte in March 1930 despite the fact that the crime was committed in daylight and more than 50 people witnessed it. She was buried in the Bessemer City Cemetery on North 12th St. Hers is one of the biggest markers there, after being expanded by the AFL–CIO in 1979 to include a marker inscribed, "She died carrying the torch of social justice."

An historic Supreme Court case on sexism originated in Bessemer City in 1985. Anderson v. Bessemer City was a case involving a woman who sued the city after applying for a position and then not being chosen based solely on the fact that she was a woman.  The Supreme Court found that discrimination was present in the decision.  The factors that Phyllis Anderson showed the court to demonstrate that the hiring committee was sexists were 1) Ms. Anderson was better qualified, 2) Testimony from one of the committee members that he thought the position would be "real hard" for a woman and that he wouldn't want his wife to perform such duties, 3) Ms. Anderson alone among the applicants was asked whether she realized that the job would involve night work and travel and whether her husband approved of her applying for the job, and 4) The reasons offered by the all-male hiring committee as to why they hired a less qualified man were pretextual.

The Bessemer City Downtown Historic District and Central School are listed on the National Register of Historic Places.

Government of Bessemer City
Bessemer City operates a Council-Manager type of government. The City Council consists of six members elected from single member wards, and the Mayor. The Mayor serves as ex-officio chair of the council. The Council and Mayor are elected every two years with no term limits. 
The current Mayor of Bessemer City is Becky S. Smith.

Demographics

2020 census

As of the 2020 United States census, there were 5,428 people, 1,994 households, and 1,363 families residing in the city.

2000 census
As of the census of 2000, there were 5,119 people, 2,009 households, and 1,436 families residing in the city. The population density was 1,205.6 people per square mile (465.0/km2). There were 2,149 housing units at an average density of 506.1 per square mile (195.2/km2). The racial makeup of the city was 83.49% White, 13.42% African American, 0.31% Native American, 0.59% Asian, 1.04% from other races, and 1.15% from two or more races. Hispanic or Latino of any race were 3.50% of the population.

Ancestries:
 United States, 21.4%
 German, 8.7%
 Irish, 7.8%
 English 5.6%
 Scots-Irish, 2.0%
 Dutch, 1.7%

For population 25 years and over in Bessemer City:
 High school or higher: 68.6%
 Bachelor's degree or higher: 7.7%
 Graduate or professional degree: 2.4%
 Unemployed: 7.0%
 Mean travel time to work: 24.5 minutes

There were 2,009 households, out of which 33.1% had children under the age of 18 living with them, 50.9% were married couples living together, 15.5% had a female householder with no husband present, and 28.5% were non-families. 23.3% of all households were made up of individuals, and 9.4% had someone living alone who was 65 years of age or older. The average household size was 2.55 and the average family size was 2.98.

In the city, the population was spread out, with 25.6% under the age of 18, 9.5% from 18 to 24, 31.1% from 25 to 44, 21.9% from 45 to 64, and 11.9% who were 65 years of age or older. The median age was 34 years. For every 100 females, there were 91.8 males. For every 100 females age 18 and over, there were 89.1 males.

The median income for a household in the city was $33,826, and the median income for a family was $39,759. Males had a median income of $31,357 versus $23,133 for females. The per capita income for the city was $15,971. About 8.8% of families and 11.9% of the population were below the poverty line, including 15.5% of those under age 18 and 11.9% of those age 65 or over.

Business and industry

One of the largest industries in Bessemer City is FMC Lithium, Inc., which operates out of Bessemer City Operations mine and is one of the largest producer of lithium in the world.  Lithium is used in many products including pharmaceuticals, batteries, ceramics, and construction products. Advanced Drainage Systems, the largest polyethylene pipe and fittings manufacturer in the country, operates a  facility in Bessemer City employing 100 people. Other manufacturers include Hunter Douglas (Designer Shades Division) and Dole. There is also still some agriculture in the form of Kiser's Dairy Farm, among others. In 2008, Kiser's dairy was converted into a farm for raising Angus beef cattle. Melvin Kiser is a descendant of one of the founding families of Bessemer City and he has about 200 animals.

Education
The following schools serve the Bessemer City area and are part of the Gaston County Schools system.
 Bessemer City Primary School (Grades: K - 2)
 Bessemer City Central Elementary School (Grades: 3 - 5)
 Bessemer City Middle School (Grades: 6 - 8)
 Bessemer City High School (Grades: 9 - 12)

The Bessemer City Branch of the Gaston County Public Library serves this community.

Notable people

 Phil Crosby, retired professional football player with the Buffalo Bills of the NFL
 James Ijames, 2022 Pulitzer Prize for Drama winning playwright of Fat Ham
 Kevin Millwood, professional baseball player
 Jimmy Wayne, country singer and songwriter, graduated from Bessemer City High School
 Ella May Wiggins, martyr of the 1929 Loray Mill Strike, lived in the  Stumptown section of Bessemer City. She was buried in the Bessemer City Cemetery on North 13th St.

References

External links
 Bessemer City official website

Cities in North Carolina
Cities in Gaston County, North Carolina
Populated places established in 1756
1756 establishments in the Thirteen Colonies